The 2018 Mercer Bears football team represented Mercer University as a member the Southern Conference (SoCon) during the 2018 NCAA Division I FCS football season. They were led by sixth-year head coach Bobby Lamb and played their home games at the Five Star Stadium in Macon, Georgia. Mercer finished the season 5–6 overall and 4–4 in SoCon play to place in a three-way tie for fifth.

Previous season
The Bears finished the 2017 season 5–6 overall and 4–4 in SoCon play to place fifth.

Preseason

Preseason media poll
The SoCon released their preseason media poll on July 25, 2018, with the Bears predicted to finish in fourth place. The same day the coaches released their preseason poll with the Bears predicted to finish in sixth place.

Preseason All-SoCon Teams
The Bears placed eight players on the preseason all-SoCon teams.

Offense

1st team

Austin Sanders – OL

Sam Walker – TE

Marquise Irvin – WR

2nd team

Tee Mitchell – RB

Defense

1st team

LeMarkus Bailey – LB

2nd team

Isaiah Buehler – DL

Eric Jackson – DB

Specialists

2nd team

Matt Shiel – P

Schedule

Game summaries

at Memphis

Jacksonville

at Samford

The Citadel

at VMI

at Yale

Western Carolina

at Wofford

East Tennessee State

at Chattanooga

Furman

References

Mercer
Mercer Bears football seasons
Mercer Bears football